Ben Wells (born April 14, 1982, in Springfield, Illinois) is an American television and movie actor. He made his debut on the feature film RiffRaff with co-star Robert Belushi.

Biography
Wells grew up in Springfield, IL and graduated in June 2005 from the University of California in Los Angeles, majoring in theater. His great-grandfather Maurice Carter Tull  was an award-winning playwright with his 1920's Broadway theater play Treason in which his great-grandmother played the walk on part of the nurse.

Television 

 2004: Love Story in Harvard

Film 

 2005: Annihilation (Short)
 2006: Riffraff

External links
 IMDb entry
 Mindlight Films

1982 births
Living people
Male actors from Illinois